Iteyevo (Etäy) is a rural locality (a selo) and the administrative centre of Iteyevsky Selsoviet, Ilishevsky District, Bashkortostan, Russia. The population was 506 as of 2010. There are 2 streets.

Geography 
Iteyevo is located 14 km northeast of Verkhneyarkeyevo (the district's administrative centre) by road. Telepanovo is the nearest rural locality.

References 

Rural localities in Ilishevsky District
Ufa Governorate